Abou-Deïa Airport  is an airstrip serving Abou-Deïa, a town in the Salamat Region in Chad. The town and airport name may also be transliterated as Aboudeïa.

Facilities 

References 

Airports in Chad
Salamat Region